The Queen Elizabeth Hospital (QEH) is a 243-bed acute care hospital located in Charlottetown, Prince Edward Island, Canada, making it the largest hospital in the province.

Operated by Health PEI, the hospital opened in 1982, resulting in the closure of the Charlottetown Hospital and the Prince Edward Island Hospital. It is named in honour of Queen Elizabeth II.

The QEH is located on a large forested campus originally known as Falconwood Farm in the northeast corner of the city adjoining the neighbourhoods of East Royalty and Sherwood, overlooking the Hillsborough River. The Hillsborough Hospital is a psychiatric hospital located on the same campus.

Services
The QEH is a full-service health care facility that provides community services to residents of Queens County and is a major referral centre for specialty services for residents across Prince Edward Island.

Some of the services that the QEH offers:

Emergency/OPD
Ambulatory care
 Surgery/Day surgery
 ICU
 CCU
 Obstetrics
 Neonatal nursing/Neonatal ICU
 Pediatrics
 Psychiatry
 Rehabilitation
 Pathology/Laboratory
 Radiology/MRI/CT Scan/Nuclear Medicine/Mammography
 Oncology
Polysomnography
Respirology
Stroke unit
PEI Cancer Treatment Centre
Internal Medicine/Endoscopy/Colonoscopy/Bronchoscopy
Special services (Pulmonary Function Testing, Blood collection, ECG/EEG, Holter monitor)

History
In 1999 the Prince Edward Island Cancer Treatment Centre opened a new facility at the QEH and was expanded in 2003. At the same time, the main entrance to the QEH off Riverside Drive was upgraded and the emergency department was expanded.

The opening of the Queen Elizabeth Hospital in 1982 also saw the end of abortion services in the province, which had been provided at the Prince Edward Island Hospital since the late 1960s.  One of the conditions that the Roman Catholic Church placed on the provincial government of Premier James Lee for merging the Catholic-affiliated Charlottetown Hospital with the secular and publicly operated Prince Edward Island Hospital into the new Queen Elizabeth Hospital was that all abortion services in the province be discontinued.

References

 Queen Elizabeth Hospital Foundation
 PEI Cancer Treatment Centre

Hospital buildings completed in 1982
Hospitals in Prince Edward Island
Buildings and structures in Charlottetown
Hospitals established in 1982
Heliports in Canada
Certified airports in Prince Edward Island
1982 establishments in Prince Edward Island